Hope is a 1997 American historical drama television film directed by Goldie Hawn. The film stars Christine Lahti, Jena Malone, Catherine O'Hara, Jeffrey D. Sams, and J. T. Walsh. It is set amid the early 1960s paranoia manufactured by the Cuban Missile Crisis and the growing restlessness of the Civil Rights Movement.

The film received positive reviews from critics, with Malone and Walsh being nominated for a Golden Globe Award and a Primetime Emmy Award, respectively, for their performances.

Plot
Kate is a young intelligent girl, living in dreary small town in the early 1960s. She lives an ordinary life with her mother, a stroke victim, and her Uncle Ray, who owns a theater. Everything changes when a 8 year old black boy dies in a fire in Uncle Ray's theater.

Cast
 Alissa Alban as Mrs. Schifflett
 Rodger Boyce as Judge Patterson
 Brady Coleman as Cecil Thompson
 Connie Cooper as Mrs. Tabor
 Haylie Duff as Martha Jean Pruitt
 Lauryn Pithey-Petrie as Talitha DuPree
 Gil Glasgow as Sheriff
 Nik Hagler as Fire Marshal Tabor
 Ira "Bud" Haynie as Bailiff
 Christine Lahti as Emma Percy
 Chris Lane as Sylvester Potter
 Linda Longserre as Mother At Theater
 Jena Malone as Lilly Kate Burns
 Alex Morris as Porter Johnson
 Mozelle Moses-Felder as Josephine
 Lee Norris as Billy October
 Catherine O'Hara as Muriel MacSwain
 J. Suzanne Rampe as Emma Stunt Double
 Jeffrey D. Sams as Jediah Walker
 Charles Sanders as Emery Gill
 Hope Shiver as Mrs. Monroe
 Joe Stevens as Flint
 Harold Suggs as Old Man Scruggs
 Mary Ellen Trainor as Maize Burns
 J. T. Walsh as Ray Percy
 Eric Bennett Weems as Lonnie Tabor
 Brandi Werlinger as Talitha's Friend
 Bill Wise as Deputy Sheriff
 Kevin Jamal Woods as Cleavell Monroe

Filming
Principal photography on the film began in June 1997. The story is set in a fictional Mississippi town, but was filmed in three towns in Texas.

Release
The film premiered on TNT on October 19, 1997. It was released on VHS by Warner Home Video.

Reception

Critical response
The film received generally positive reviews from critics, who praised Goldie Hawn's direction and the performances of the cast. Ray Richmond of Variety wrote that Hawn "embodies a surprising maturity and assurance directing this tearjerker" and "also benefits in Hope from some terrific acting support via principals Jena Malone, Christine Lahti, Jeffrey D. Sams, J. T. Walsh and Catherine O'Hara; all are at the top of their game, and it's a tribute to Hawn that they are." He concluded his review with, "Hawn displays an impressive knack for imagery, and for allowing her cast the freedom to shine." Steven Linan of the Los Angeles Times noted that Hawn "has the distinct advantage of working with a very good cast." Scott D. Pierce of Deseret News stated that "Hope is very nicely mounted, with plenty of money thrown into the production." Chris Kaltenbach of The Baltimore Sun called the film "a quiet, thoughtful, well-acted piece of work filled with what its title suggests."

Awards and nominations

References

External links
 

1997 films
1997 drama films
1997 television films
1990s historical drama films
American historical drama films
Civil rights movement in television
American drama television films
Films about families
Films about racism in the United States
Films about the Cuban Missile Crisis
Films scored by Steve Porcaro
Films set in 1962
Films set in Mississippi
Films shot in Texas
Historical television films
Films about mother–daughter relationships
TNT Network original films
1990s English-language films
1990s American films